Arkhangelsky (masculine), Arkhangelskaya (feminine), or Arkhangelskoye (neuter) may refer to:

People
Arkhangelsky (surname)

Places
Arkhangelsky District, a district in the Republic of Bashkortostan, Russia
Arkhangelsky (rural locality) (Arkhangelskaya, Arkhangelskoye), name of several rural localities in Russia
Arkhangelsk Oblast (Arkhangelskaya oblast), a federal subject of Russia

Other uses
Arkhangelskoye Palace, a historical estate near Moscow, Russia
Arkhangelski, a Soviet military design bureau led by Alexander Arkhangelsky
Arkhangelsky Ar-2, a bomber designed by this design bureau
Arkhangelsky (crater), a crater on Mars named after him